Patrick Michael DiNizio (October 12, 1955 – December 12, 2017) was the lead singer, songwriter, and founding member of the band The Smithereens, which he formed in 1980 with Jim Babjak, Dennis Diken, and Mike Mesaros, from Carteret, New Jersey.

Life and career
DiNizio was born in Plainfield, New Jersey, and grew up in nearby Scotch Plains, where he attended Scotch Plains-Fanwood High School. DiNizio was a trash hauler, working for his father while trying to break into the music business. He has cited his influences as Buddy Holly and The Beatles.

In addition to his work with The Smithereens, he released a number of solo albums, Songs and Sounds (1997), This is Pat DiNizio, a collection of cover songs arranged for piano and vocals (2006), Revolutions (2 CDs plus 1 DVD, limited edition of 300 copies, 2006), Pat DiNizio (2007), and Pat DiNizio/Buddy Holly (2008). An expanded 2-CD version of This is Pat DiNizio was issued in 2012. 

DiNizio made an unsuccessful run in the 2000 United States Senate election in New Jersey, running on the Reform Party ticket. He finished 4th with 19,312 votes (0.64%). The campaign was chronicled in the 2001 documentary film Mr. Smithereen Goes to Washington.

The same year, he launched the "Living Room Tour", a five-month jaunt where he performed solo, by request only, in the homes of fans. The tour was a success, and he later occasionally performed similar concerts for a nominal fee. He considered fans to be friends and hosted Memorial Day picnics for them in his own backyard.  In his own words, "This 'involving the audience' philosophy of mine is about breaking down the walls and barriers that traditionally have separated artists and audience."

In 2001, DiNizio was one of the first musicians to throw his support behind XM Satellite Radio, becoming host and program director for the XM Radio Unsigned station. He was also an inaugural member of the Independent Music Awards' judging panel to support independent artists. The Verge was not DiNizio's first radio hosting job; in 1990 he hosted the second season of the short-lived syndicated radio program "Soho Natural Sessions" and in 1991 its successor, "Maxwell House Coffeehouse Sessions".

In 2006, he was the focus of 7th Inning Stretch, an ESPN2 reality special. The special focused on DiNizio's recovery from a "life-threatening and debilitating nervous disorder" by training and attempting to try out for a Minor League Baseball team (The Somerset Patriots), along with tales of baseball folklore from other musicians such as Joan Jett, Gene Simmons, and Bruce Springsteen.

DiNizio also released a book (also available in audiobook format), Confessions Of A Rock Star, and continued to perform both solo acoustic shows and with The Smithereens. From November 2011 to June 2012, DiNizio presented a condensed, live adaptation of the book (with storytelling and full band accompaniment) in nightly performances at the Riviera Hotel & Casino in Las Vegas.  Through September 2017, he toured nationally with The Smithereens and performed in venues near his home with his local band, The Scotchplainsmen.

Death
DiNizio died in Summit, New Jersey, on December 12, 2017, at the age of 62. According to bandmates, his health declined following a series of problems that began in 2015 after a pair of falls that resulted in nerve damage that limited the use of his right hand and arm.

Awards and honors 
•  In 1987, Pat was nominated for two New York Music Awards (Best Rock Vocalist (Male) and Best Songwriter) and The Smithereens were nominated for four more, the Rising Star Award (Outstanding Debut Act), the Local Heroes Award (Outstanding Rock Band), Best Debut Album (Especially for You), and Best Independent Single (Blood and Roses), winning the latter three categories.  In 1988, The Smithereens won the New York Music Awards for best rock band.

•  On June 7, 1990, The Smithereens' recording Smithereens 11 was certified gold (500,000 copies sold) by the RIAA.

•  On November 17, 2015, he was inducted into the Scotch Plains-Fanwood High School Hall of Fame.

•  On April 14, 2016, he was named one of "The 12 Greatest New Jersey Singers Ever" by the Asbury Park Press.

•  On April 18, 2018, the township of Scotch Plains ceremonially named the street near his former home "Pat DiNizio Way".

•  On January 18, 2019, he was inducted as an "Asbury Angel" at the 19th annual Light of Day Winterfest in Asbury Park, NJ.

•  On October 27, 2019,  The Smithereens were inducted into the New Jersey Hall of Fame in the Class of 2018.

Discography

Studio albums
Songs and Sounds, 1997 (Velvel Records)
This Is Pat DiNizio, 2006 (Fuel 2000)
Pat DiNizio, 2007 (East West Records)
Pat DiNizio/Buddy Holly, 2009 (Koch Records)

Compilation albums
The Best of Pat DiNizio, 2015 (Airline Records)

Other appearances
 Acoustic Aid, 1992 (Kome 98.5, Oxymoron P & D Inc) – "Blood and Roses" (Recorded live in New York City as broadcast on KOME, December 1990)
 Piss & Vinegar - The Songs of Graham Parker, 1996 (Buy Or Die Records) – "Local Girls" and "That's What They All Say" ("Local Girls" performed with Frank Black and Gary Lucas)
 Who's Not Forgotten - FDR's Tribute to The Who, 2003 (Face Down Records) – "Behind Blue Eyes"

Filmography

Films
 Singles (1992), actor
 Mr. Smithereen Goes to Washington (2001), actor
 King Leisure S.O.B. (2004), writer/director/actor
 Dead Horse (2004), actor/producer/composer

Television
 Space Ghost: Coast to Coast (1996, Cartoon Network), as himself
Mother-Tongue: Italian-American Sons and Mothers (1999), as himself
 7th Inning Stretch (2006, ESPN2), actor/director/writer/producer

Bibliography

Milano, Brett (2003). Vinyl Junkies. Foreword by Pat DiNizio.  St Martin's Griffin.

References

External links

1955 births
2017 deaths
The Smithereens members
Musicians from Plainfield, New Jersey
People from Scotch Plains, New Jersey
Scotch Plains-Fanwood High School alumni
American baritones
American rock singers
Jersey Shore musicians
Singers from New Jersey
Reform Party of the United States of America politicians
American people of Italian descent